Para Lake, officially Swami Vivekanand Lake, is located in Mehsana city in Gujarat state of India. Excavated during the Gaekwad rule, it was redeveloped and opened in 2019.

History
The lake was excavated during the Gaekwad rule. In 2007, the Mehsana Municipality appointed a contractor for beautification and redevelopment of the lake and the project was started by Anil Patel, then Member of Gujarat Legislative Assembly. The project was restarted in 2016. The lake was renamed after Swami Vivekanand and opened to the public on 4 August 2019 by Deputy Chief Minister Nitinbhai Patel.

Amenities
The children play area, yoga centre, food court, jogging tracks and boating felicities are developed and a toy train is introduced.

See also 
 Rajmahal, Mehsana
 Boter Kothani Vav
 Nagalpur Lake

References

Lakes of Gujarat
Tourist attractions in Mehsana district
Mehsana
Redeveloped ports and waterfronts in India